Onverwacht is a suburb of Lephalale in Waterberg District Municipality in the Limpopo province of South Africa.

References

Populated places in the Lephalale Local Municipality